Don Allen may refer to:

 Don Allen (American football) (born 1939), American football fullback
 Don Allen (golfer), American golfer
 Don Allen (cricketer) (born 1947), Australian cricketer
 Don A. Allen (1900–1983), politician in California
 Don E. Allen, American professional wrestler
 T. D. Allen, pen-name of Don Bala Allen and Terry (Terril) Diener Allen

See also
 Donald Allen (1912–2004), editor, publisher and translator
 Donald Allen (cricketer) (1926–2008), Australian cricketer